Annie Flavin (born 20 July 1961) is a former American rugby union player. She was a part of the  championship team that won the inaugural 1991 Women's Rugby World Cup after defeating  in the final. She was also selected for the 1994 Women's Rugby World Cup squad that competed in Scotland.

Flavin featured in the Eagles first international test match against Canada in Victoria, British Columbia on 14 November 1987. In 2017 she was inducted into the U.S. Rugby Hall of Fame alongside the 1991 Rugby World Cup team.

References 

Living people
1961 births
Female rugby union players
American female rugby union players
United States women's international rugby union players